Paeniglutamicibacter sulfureus is a bacterium from the genus Paeniglutamicibacter which has been isolated from oil brine.

References

External links
Type strain of Paeniglutamicibacter sulfureus at BacDive -  the Bacterial Diversity Metadatabase

Bacteria described in 1984
Micrococcaceae